Chow Shiu-hung (born 15 January 1935) is a Taiwanese former footballer. He competed in the men's tournament at the 1960 Summer Olympics.

References

External links
 
 

1935 births
Living people
Taiwanese footballers
Chinese Taipei international footballers from Hong Kong
Olympic footballers of Taiwan
Footballers at the 1960 Summer Olympics
Association football forwards